Germany competed at the 2013 World Games held in Cali, Colombia.

Medalists

Archery 

Two medals were won in archery. Elena Richter won the silver medal in the women's recurve event. Paul Titscher and Kristina Berger won the bronze medal in the mixed team compound event.

Karate 

Two medals were won by German karateka. Jonathan Horne won the gold medal in the men's kumite +84 kg event and Noah Bitsch won the silver medal in the men's kumite 75 kg event.

References 

Nations at the 2013 World Games
2013 in German sport
2013